Katherine Leigh Ritchie is an Australian actress, radio presenter, and children's author. She is best known for her long-running role as original character Sally Fletcher on the television soap opera Home and Away, for which she won two Gold Logie awards. She played the character for 20 years, appearing from the pilot episode in 1988 until 2008. Ritchie was part of Nova FM's national drive show, Kate, Tim & Joel with Tim Blackwell and Joel Creasey from 2014 until 2023.

In March 2023, it was announced as co-host on Nova 96.9's breakfast show Fitzy & Wippa with Kate Ritchie.  

Prior to her retirement from Home and Away, she shared with fellow original cast members Ray Meagher and Norman Coburn the record (recognised by Guinness World Records) for the longest continuous role in an Australian drama series. After a five-year absence, Ritchie returned to Home and Away in 2013 for a short reprise of her role as Sally Fletcher to commemorate the 25th anniversary of the series.

In addition to 20 years on Home and Away, Ritchie has also hosted various television events and appeared in commercials, a mini-series and an Australian film. She has also been involved with the Campbelltown Musical Society.

Early life
Ritchie was born as Katherine Leigh Ritchie. Her parents are Heather and Steve, and she has three younger siblings, Rebekah, Stuart and Susan. Ritchie attended Campbelltown North Public School and Hurlstone Agricultural High School – the latter a New South Wales agricultural and selective school.

Career

1986–2007
Ritchie was cast as Molly, the child lead in the 1986 Nine Network–PBL mini-series Cyclone Tracy, starring Chris Haywood and Tracy Mann. She started working with Home and Away in 1987, at age 8. Production began in July 1987 (shortly before her ninth birthday) and it premiered on the Seven Network on 17 January 1988. In 2006, Ritchie played "Nicole" in the ABC film Stepfather of the Bride. Whilst promoting Home and Away in the United Kingdom in 2006 with Mark Furze and Jodi Gordon, Ritchie appeared on The Friday Night Project and Loose Women, and appeared on interviews for Five and Five Life.

In 2006, Ritchie was a contestant on the celebrity singing competition It Takes Two, partnered with Troy Cassar-Daley. The pair placed fourth in the competition. She co-hosted the second series of It Takes Two with Grant Denyer in 2007. In 2007 Ritchie joined Nova radio to co-host the drive show with comedian Akmal Saleh, replacing Matthew Newton. She was replaced in May by New Zealand comedian Cal Wilson.

In September 2007, Ritchie announced that she would be leaving Home and Away in mid-December. Her final scenes were filmed on 13 December 2007, and she last appeared on Australian screens as Sally Fletcher on 3 April 2008, with her final episode being screened on UK terrestrial television on 12 May 2008.

2008–present
On 14 January 2008, Ritchie began work on the Nova 96.9 breakfast show with Merrick & Rosso. Shortly after the 2008 Logie Awards Ritchie did an interview with Rove McManus on Network Ten, her first interview with another network since leaving Home and Away, and her first television appearance since leaving the show. On 16 October Ritchie appeared on pay-TV, on The Merrick & Rosso Show.

In November, it was revealed that Ritchie would appear in the second series of Underbelly, as Judi Kane, the wife of slain 1970s standover man Les Kane. The series screened in 2009. This was her first TV drama role since leaving Home and Away. Throughout 2009, Ritchie continued her radio role on the Merrick & Rosso and Kate Ritchie Show.

In 2009 Ritchie became the face of Vaseline. It was announced on 7 November 2009 that Ritchie would host the 2009 ARIA Awards on 26 November, alongside actor and fellow Underbelly cast member Gyton Grantley.

On 10 November 2009, Ritchie announced she would be leaving Nova 96.9's breakfast team and returning to acting. In January 2010 it was announced that Ritchie had been cast with a lead role in Nine's new police drama Cops L.A.C. The series did not rate well and was cancelled after the season finale.

In 2012, Ritchie narrated the Australian version of the reality series Don't Tell the Bride, which aired on Ch-10. In early 2013, it was announced that Ritchie was returning to Home & Away, reprising her role as Sally Fletcher.

In 2013, Ritchie announced via Twitter that she would be hosting the Nova FM drive show with Tim Blackwell and Marty Sheargold in 2014, following the departure of Meshel Laurie, who went on to host Breakfast on Nova 100 in Melbourne.The show won three major ACRA awards. In 2015 the team won Best Networked Program at the Australian Commercial Radio Awards, and the Best On Air team in both 2016 and 2017.

On 25 November 2015, Ritchie became the Godmother of the Cruise liner Pacific Eden, which is from the P&O Fleet.

In 2016 Ritchie released a children's book illustrated by Hannah Sommerville called I Just Couldn't Wait To Meet You. Her second book, It's Not Scribble to Me, was illustrated by Jedda Robaard and published by Random House Australia in 2018.

In June 2016 Ritchie was announced as the brand ambassador for QV Skincare.

Ritchie was to host the retrospective 50th anniversary of Play School in July 2016.

In June 2021, Ritchie was announced to be a judge on Australia's Got Talent.

In 2023, it was announced that Ritchie would be permanently departing her Nova radio show Kate, Tim & Joel after being absent for some time. It was later revealed that she would join Fitzy & Wippa and co-host Fitzy & Wippa with Kate Ritchie from March 2023. It was also announced that singer-songwriter and television presenter Ricki-Lee Coulter would replace Ritchie on Ricki-Lee, Tim & Joel.

Personal life
Ritchie started dating St George Illawara Dragons player Stuart Webb in 2008. On 9 September 2009, it was announced that they were engaged. On 25 September 2010 Ritchie married Webb in a countryside outdoor wedding at Quamby Estate in Tasmania.

On 17 August 2014, Ritchie gave birth to daughter.

On 7 November 2019, Stuart Webb agreed to an AVO which was applied for by a police constable on behalf of Ritchie following a domestic incident on 17 October. The AVO prevents Webb from stalking, intimidating, assaulting or threatening, as well as approaching or being in the company of Ritchie "for at least 12 hours after drinking alcohol or taking illicit drugs".

In August 2022, she was caught drink driving with alcohol level of 0.06. She was suspended driving for 3 months.

Filmography

Awards and nominations

References

External links
 

1978 births
Actors from New South Wales
Australian child actresses
Australian soap opera actresses
Australian women radio presenters
Gold Logie winners
Living people
Nova (radio network) announcers